K2-236b is a Neptune-like exoplanet that orbits an F-type star. It is also called EPIC 211945201 b. Its mass is 27 Earths, it takes 19.5 days to complete one orbit of its star, and is 0.148 AU from its star. Its discovery was announced in 2018. This was the first exoplanet discovered by scientists based in India. The discoverers were Abhijit Chakraborty (PRL), Arpita Roy (Caltech), Rishikesh Sharma (PRL), Suvrath Mahadevan (Penn State), Priyanka Chaturvedi (Thüringer Landessternwarte Tautenburg), Neelam J.S.S.V Prasad (PRL), and B. G. Anandarao (PRL).

Overview 
The exoplanet K2-236b was discovered in 2018 using the transit method. Using this method, astronomers can see everything from methane to water vapor on other planets by photometry. It is the only planet orbiting around EPIC 211945201, a G0 class star, situated in the constellation of Cancer in 596 light-years from the Sun. Its host star is aged 4 billion years. K2-236b orbits its star in about 19 terrestrial days. It orbits closer to the star than the internal limit of the habitable zone. It has a low density and may be composed of gas.

Discovery 
K2-236b was found to be a planetary candidate from K2 photometry in Campaigns 5 & 16. The exoplanet transits the bright star (Vmag = 10.15, G0 spectral type) in a 19.492 day orbit. The photometric data combined with false positive probability calculations using VESPA may not be sufficient to confirm the planetary scenario but high-resolution spectroscopic are taken using the PARAS spectrograph (19 radial velocity observations) over a time-baseline of 420 days. 

The data shows that the planet has a radius of 6.12 ± 0.1 R⊕, and a mass of  M⊕. It consists of a density of  g/cm3. Based on the mass and radius, it estimates that the heavy element content is 60-70 % of the total mass. The surface temperature of the planet was found to be around 776.35 K, as it is very close to the host star. It is seven times nearer to its star, in comparison with Earth-Sun distance. This shows that the extra-solar planet is in the uninhabitable zone. The discovery is of importance for understanding the formation mechanism of such super-Neptune or sub-Saturn kind of planets, that are too close to the host star, according to scientists.

See also 

 List of potentially habitable exoplanets
 List of exoplanet firsts
 List of exoplanetary host stars
 List of exoplanets discovered using the Kepler spacecraft
 List of planets observed during Kepler's K2 mission
 List of nearest terrestrial exoplanet candidates

References 

Transiting exoplanets
Exoplanets discovered by K2
Exoplanets discovered in 2018
Cancer (constellation)